Walter "Baby Sweets" Perkins (February 10, 1932 in Chicago, Illinois – February 14, 2004 in Queens, New York) was an American jazz drummer.

Starting out in Chicago, Perkins began his professional career with Ahmad Jamal in 1956–57. In 1959, he regrouped under the same name with Willie Thomas on trumpet, Frank Strozier on alto sax, Harold Mabern on piano, and Cranshaw on bass; they recorded for Vee-Jay in 1959 and 1960 and played in Chicago until 1962, when he moved to New York City.

Perkins played with Sonny Rollins in 1962 and accompanied Carmen McRae in 1962–63. In 1964 he played with Art Farmer and Teddy Wilson. Following this he recorded with many musicians, including Rahsaan Roland Kirk, George Shearing, Gene Ammons, Charles Mingus, Billy Taylor, Booker Ervin, Jaki Byard, Lucky Thompson, Pat Martino, Sonny Stitt, Sonny Criss, and Charles Earland.

He died in Queens of lung cancer at the age of 72.

Discography
With MJT+3
 Daddy-O Presents MJT + 3 (Argo, 1957)
 Walter Perkins' MJT + 3 (Vee-Jay, 1959)
 Make Everybody Happy (Vee-Jay, 1960)
 MJT + 3 (Vee-Jay, 1960)
 Message from Walton Street (Vee-Jay, 1960)
With Ahmed Abdul-Malik
 Spellbound (Status, 1964)
With Gene Ammons
 Twisting the Jug (Prestige, 1961) with Joe Newman and Jack McDuff
 Soul Summit Vol. 2 (Prestige, 1962)
 Late Hour Special (Prestige, 1962, [1964])
 Sock! (Prestige, 1962 [1965])
With Chris Anderson
 Inverted Image (Jazzland, 1961)
With Peter Brötzmann
 The Ink Is Gone (2002)
With Ray Bryant
 Soul (Sue, 1965)
With Jaki Byard
 Out Front! (Prestige, 1964)
With Johnny Coles
 Little Johnny C (Blue Note, 1963)
With Sonny Criss
 Sonny Criss at the Crossroads (Peacock, 1959)
With Charles Earland
Soul Crib (Choice, 1969)
Smokin' (Muse, 1969/77 [1977])
Mama Roots (Muse, 1969/77 [1977])
With Booker Ervin
 Exultation! (Prestige, 1964)
With Art Farmer
 Interaction (Atlantic, 1963) with Jim Hall
 Live at the Half-Note (Atlantic, 1963) with Jim Hall
With Gigi Gryce
 Reminiscin' (Mercury, 1960)
With Ahmad Jamal
 Count 'Em 88 (Argo, 1956)
With J. J. Johnson
 J.J.'s Broadway (Verve, 1963)
With Etta Jones
 Lonely and Blue (Prestige, 1962)
With Roland Kirk
 Reeds & Deeds (1963)
 I Talk with the Spirits (1964)
With Harold Mabern
 A Few Miles from Memphis (Prestige, 1968)
With Pat Martino
 Strings! (Prestige, 1967)
With Charles Mingus
 Mingus Mingus Mingus Mingus Mingus (Impulse!, 1963)
With Sal Nistico
Heavyweights (Jazzland, 1961)
With William Parker
 Bob's Pink Cadillac (Eremite, 2000)
With Duke Pearson
 Hush! (Jazzline, 1962)
With Dave Pike
 Pike's Peak (Epic, 1962)
 Dave Pike Plays the Jazz Version of Oliver! (Moodsville, 1963)
With Sonny Stitt
 The Matadors Meet the Bull (Roulette, 1965)
 What's New!!! (Roulette, 1966)
 I Keep Comin' Back! (Roulette, 1966)
With Frank Strozier
 Long Night (Jazzland, 1961)
With Billy Taylor
 Impromptu (Mercury, 1962)
With Clark Terry
 The Happy Horns of Clark Terry (Impulse!, 1964)
With Lucky Thompson
 Lucky Thompson Plays Happy Days Are Here Again (Prestige, 1965)
With Bobby Timmons
 Holiday Soul (1964)
With John Wright
Mr. Soul (Prestige, 1962)

External links
 Walter Perkins Interview NAMM Oral History Library (1997)

References

Scott Yanow, [ Walter Perkins] at Allmusic

1932 births
2004 deaths
American jazz drummers
Musicians from Chicago
Vee-Jay Records artists
20th-century American drummers
American male drummers
Jazz musicians from Illinois
20th-century American male musicians
American male jazz musicians